Dear Green Place is a Scottish comedy programme set in a park in central Glasgow. It first aired on 19 October 2007 on BBC One Scotland. The second series finished airing on 5 December 2008.

The show was created by comedy actor Paul Riley, and features Ford Kiernan, both of whom featured in the sketch show Chewin' the Fat, and its successful sitcom spin-off Still Game.

It was announced in April 2009 that BBC Scotland would not be commissioning a third series due to poor viewing figures and also having commissioned a new series of Rab C. Nesbitt and Ford Kiernan's new sitcom Happy Hollidays.

Cast
 Archie Henderson – played by Ford Kiernan
 Riordan – played by Paul Riley
 Peter McAllister – played by Paul Blair
 Woody – played by Johnny Austin
 Wallace – played by Martin Docherty
 Michelle – played by Jenny Ryan
 Tina – played by Carmen Pieraccini
 Toner – played by Michael MacKenzie
 Gavin – played by Gavin Jon Wright

Episodes

Series 1
 "Rocksalt": Some of the dopier lads get a crash course in rock salt, while boss Henderson takes a horse for an eventful walk.
 'Sorry': McAllister accidentally reveals his secret relationship with Michelle and must find a way of making it up to her. Meanwhile, Henderson suffers an allergic reaction.
 "Pish": Woody and Wallace are set to fail a mandatory drugs test until Wallace's granny provides the solution. McAllister invents a bogus girlfriend to make Michelle jealous.
 "There's Been A Murder: Henderson and Toner are on the trail of a swan murderer. Riordan queues against his will for concert tickets.
 "Gimme Shelter": Riordan and Michelle find some air raid shelters in the park while Woody and Wallace are on night shift at the museum.
 "Bandstand": An eco-warrior chains himself to a bandstand threatened with demolition.

Series 2
 "Beetlemania": A beetle infestation threatens the park, while pheromones mean that love is in the air.
 "Uppers and Downers": Woody and Wallace uncover a time capsule, and an insomniac Nazi tries to get some sleep.
 "Goats": Woody and Wallace have to look after cashmere goats and they attempt to sell the cashmere whilst Archie's wife Alice is locked out of the house and needs his help.
 "Waiting for Smeato": As Tina's cafe approaches its grand re-opening, everyone is wondering who the mystery guest is.
 Industrial Daftness": The parkies imitate deafness in order to get a payout from the doctors and Archie has a conflict with the bowling club over a 20 mph zone sign which causes one of the members to get run over.
 "Puppy Love": Tina installs a new tanning booth in the cafe and Peter & Michelle are on the hunt for a new pet dog.

Reception
The series was received negatively. A review in The Scotsman criticised the show's humour for being unoriginal.

DVD release
 Series 1 DVD was released in December 2007.
 Series 2 DVD was released in December 2008.

References

External links
 
 

BBC television comedy
BBC Scotland television shows
Scottish television sitcoms
2007 Scottish television series debuts
Television shows set in Glasgow
2008 Scottish television series endings
2000s Scottish television series
Scots-language mass media